Le Pont-de-Beauvoisin may refer to the following places in France:

 Canton of Le Pont-de-Beauvoisin, Savoie department
 Le Pont-de-Beauvoisin, Isère, in the Isère department
 Le Pont-de-Beauvoisin, Savoie, in the Savoie department